Paraflata is a genus of planthoppers in the family Flatidae. It was first described by Leopold Melichar in 1901. Species in the genus are found on Madagascar.

Parasitism 
Paraflata species are parasitized by the larvae of Epipyropidae moths.

References 

Flatidae
Auchenorrhyncha genera
Insects of Madagascar